Alfred D. Schiaffo (June 22, 1920 – November 5, 1988) was an American politician who served in the New Jersey Senate from the 13th district from 1968 to 1973.

He attended John Marshall Law School.

In 1976, he was nominated by Governor Brendan T. Byrne to serve as a judge on New Jersey Superior Court.

A resident of Hackensack, he died on November 5, 1988, at Englewood Hospital in Englewood, New Jersey at age 68.

References

1920 births
1988 deaths
Republican Party New Jersey state senators
New Jersey state court judges
People from Hackensack, New Jersey
20th-century American politicians
20th-century American judges